The 2003 FIA GT Magny-Cours 500 km was the second round the 2003 FIA GT Championship.  It took place at the Circuit de Nevers Magny-Cours, France, on April 27, 2003.

Official results
Class winners in bold.  Cars failing to complete 70% of winner's distance marked as Not Classified (NC).

† – #89 Team Maranello Concessionaires was disqualified after the car failed post-race technical inspection.  The car's fuel tank was found to be larger than the rules allowed.

Statistics
 Pole position – #23 BMS Scuderia Italia – 1:55.642
 Fastest lap – #23 BMS Scuderia Italia – 1:38.625
 Average speed – 151.380 km/h

References

 
 
 

M
FIA GT
FIA GT Magny-Cours 500km